Yana Vitaliivna Hladiychuk (born 21 May 1993) is a Ukrainian athlete. She competed in the women's pole vault event at the 2020 Summer Olympics.

References

External links
 

1993 births
Living people
Ukrainian female pole vaulters
Athletes (track and field) at the 2020 Summer Olympics
Olympic athletes of Ukraine
Place of birth missing (living people)